The Sopron–Kőszeg railway line, also known as Burgerlandbahn, is a railway line formerly connecting Sopron and Kőszeg, two towns in western Hungary, through Burgenland. It is a single-track partly electrified line, operated by ÖBB (passenger trains) and GySEV (goods trains). Its only connection to the rest of the ÖBB network currently is through Sopron.

Operations on most of the track (between Deutschkreutz and Kőszeg) have been ceased in a few stages. As the Iron Curtain has cut off Hungary from Austria, passenger traffic between Rattersdorf-Liebing and Kőszeg had to be stopped on 6 October 1951, with goods trains no longer operating since 1 September 1960 on, with only corridor traffic being allowed. The track from Oberloisdorf in the direction of Hungary has been dismantled on 28 April 1969. All traffic between Deutschkreutz and Oberloisdorf stopped on 15 December 2013.

Gallery

External links 

International railway lines
Railway lines in Austria
Railway lines in Hungary
Sopron
Kőszeg
Austria–Hungary relations